This is the discography of Turkish classical music artist Orhan Gencebay. Gencebay's total album sales are close to 65 million copies.

Albums

78rpm

45rpm/EP

LP/33rpm 

Published in foreign countries

Israel

Germany

Other works

References 

Discographies of Turkish artists
Pop music discographies
Folk music discographies